The Key is the eighth studio album by the British singer-songwriter Joan Armatrading, released on 28 February 1983 by A&M Records (AMLX64912). The album was recorded at Townhouse Studios in Shepherd's Bush, London; Polar Studios in Stockholm and also in New York.

The album spawned the single "Drop the Pilot", which became one of Armatrading's biggest hits, reaching number 11 in the UK Singles Chart over a 10-week stay. It also quickly became a staple of Armatrading's live performances and has featured on many of her compilation albums. Armatrading and her backing band also performed the song on Top of the Pops in early 1983.

Background and recording 
Steve Lillywhite was commissioned to produce the album; however, A&M Records judged the album to be not commercial enough and asked Armatrading to come up with some additional, more commercial, material. She went away and wrote the tracks "Drop the Pilot" and "What Do Boys Dream", both of which were produced separately in New York by Val Garay. These two tracks therefore used a completely different set of musicians, which explains the length of the personnel list on this album. Armatrading described her process of song creation, from writing to final recording, at the time of The Key: 

Armatrading draws on a variety of musical styles for this album, from Stax style brass, rhythm and blues and punk, as well as the rock guitar of Adrian Belew, who had played with David Bowie on Lodger.

The album's title refers to the door key which Armatrading habitually wore around her neck at that time and which is featured in the album's photography. She is also pictured playing a Gibson Les Paul electric guitar.

"(I Love It When You) Call Me Names" was written about two men in a band who were always arguing, and features a guitar solo by Adrian Belew. It was released as a single, though it did not chart. It subsequently became a staple of Armatrading's live performances and has appeared on many of her compilation albums. Armatrading said of the song, "It's come out as a man and a woman, but I was really looking at two guys. Not two gay guys, just two guys who are friends who tend to treat each other like this, always calling each other names. There's sort of this love/hate relationship between them, but you get the feeling that they really enjoy this thing that they're going through."

Reception 
The album was a commercial success for Armatrading, reaching number 10 in the UK album charts and number 32 in the US album charts, as well as spawning the hit single "Drop the Pilot". It was certified Gold by the BPI. The album is one of only two Armatrading albums to reach the top 40 in the USA, the other being Me Myself I. The album peaked at number 4 in Australia and was that country's 7th biggest-selling album of the year.

Debra Rae Cohen, writing in The New York Times, said that the album's songs "dwell on the underlying truths and unadmitted paradoxes of love, of independence, and the area where they overlap and struggle", that Armatrading "shows a new control in her arrangements", the album being "one more step in Miss Armatrading's continual journey" and that The Key should help her to "become a household name". Rolling Stones Don Shewey, however, disapproved of the album's commercial approach, commenting that, "For more than ten years, Armatrading has remained a commercially marginal cult figure, and on The Key, she seems to have decided to part with the one thing standing between her and success: her originality. The album has several pleasantly energetic tunes that anybody could have written. And both her dramatic monologues and her love songs traffic in the kind of musical and lyrical clichés she previously has always avoided or transcended." He singled out "Call Me Names" and "The Key" as the only two standout tracks on the album, and gave it two and a half out of five stars.

Martin C. Strong noted in The Great Rock Discography that the album was "well received" and represented one of Armatrading's "sole sojourns into the American Top 40". Gillian G. Gaar, writing in She's A Rebel, described "(I Love It When You) Call Me Names" as "a cheeky song" and cited it, and the album generally, as an example of the "more commercial sound that resulted in greater album sales in America".

The album was nominated for both the Grammy Awards for Best Rock Vocal Performance, Female and Best Album Package at the 1984 Grammy Awards.

Track listing 
All tracks written and arranged by Joan Armatrading.

Side 1 

"(I Love It When You) Call Me Names"     4:23
"Foolish Pride"     3:16
"Drop the Pilot"     3:41
"The Key"   4:01
"Everybody Gotta Know"     3:48

Side 2 

"Tell Tale"     2:31
"What Do Boys Dream"     2:55
"The Game of Love"     3:34
"The Dealer"     3:19
"Bad Habits"     3:43
"I Love My Baby"     3:29

Personnel

Musicians
Joan Armatrading – vocals, acoustic guitar, electric guitar, piano
Adrian Belew – electric guitar
Daryl Stuermer – electric guitar
Gary Sanford – electric guitar
Tony Levin – bass guitar
Larry Fast – synthesisers
Jerry Marotta – drums
Stewart Copeland – drums
Julian Diggle – percussion
Mel Collins – saxophone
Annie Whitehead – trombone
Guy Barker – trumpet
Dean Klevatt – piano
Jeremy Meek – bass vocal

Musicians on "Drop the Pilot" & "What Do Boys Dream"

Joan Armatrading – vocals
Craig Hull – electric guitar
Tim Pierce – electric guitar
Bryan Garofalo – bass guitar
Steve "Goldie" Goldstein – keyboards
Craig Krampf – drums
M. L. Benoit – percussion
Val Garay – production

Production team
Producer: Steve Lillywhite
Engineer: Mark Dearnley
New York producer & engineer: Val Garay
New York producer's assistant: Niko Bolas
Cover painting: Donna Muir
Photography: Jamie Morgan
Design & art direction: Michael Ross

Charts

Weekly charts

Year-end charts

Certifications

References 

 Sleeve notes: The Key, 1983, A & M Records (AMLX 64912)
 Gaar, Gillian G (1993) She's A Rebel: The History of Women in Rock and Roll, Blandford 
 Hardy, Phil, Laing, Dave, Barnard, Stephen, & Perretta, Don (1988) Encyclopedia of Rock, Schirmer. 
 Mayes, Sean (1990). Joan Armatrading – A Biography (unauthorised). Weidenfeld and Nicolson. .
 Strong, Martin C. (2002) The Great Rock Discography (7th Edition), Canongate Books 

1983 albums
Joan Armatrading albums
Albums produced by Steve Lillywhite
Albums produced by Val Garay
A&M Records albums
Albums recorded at Polar Studios